Joe N Little III (born July 14, 1968) is an American singer, songwriter and producer who is best known as the lead singer of the 90s R&B group, Rude Boys, who had two No. 1 R&B singles, "Written All Over Your Face" and "Are You Lonely For Me", on Billboard R&B/Hip Hop Chart. They received a Billboard Award for "Written All Over Your Face", as the No. 1 R&B song of 1991.

Early life
Little was born on July 14, 1968 in Cleveland, Ohio to parents Joe Little Jr., and Patricia Ann Little.

Career

Rude Boys
In 1987, Little along with friends Edward Lee Banks, Larry Marcus, and Melvin Sephus (Rude Boys) was discovered by R&B singer Gerald Levert who got them a record contract with Atlantic Records.

In 1990, Rude Boys released their debut album entitled, "Rude Awakening" releasing 4 singles, "Heaven", "Come Let's Do This", and their two Billboard top charting No.1 R&B hits, "Written All Over Your Face" a top 20 on Billboard's Top 100 chart, and  "Are You Lonely For Me". They released two more albums: "Rude House" in 1992 and "Rude As Ever" in 1997.

Writing and producing

Through the 90s and 2000s Little collaborated with other artists, producing and songwriting. In 1998, he co-wrote and produced two singles, "It's Your Turn" and "No Mans Land", for Levert's RIAA Platinum album "Love & Consequences" In 2000, Little and Levert co-wrote and produced the singles "Selfish Reasons" and "Proven and True" for The Temptations' album "Ear-Resistible", which won a Grammy Award for Best Traditional R&B Vocal Album.

Solo projects
In 1994, as solo artist, Little released his debut album entitled, "Puttin' It Down" on Atlantic Records under the name J. Little.  four singles, "When I Think Of You", "Beautiful", "Holiday Song" and "All Of Me" on his own label, Brother 2 Brother International.

Other work
In 2010, Little opened a coffee shop in Cleveland, Ohio where he grew up named, Urbean Joe Coffee House on St. Clair Avenue near 152nd Street. He opened a second location in May 2011 at Larchmere Boulevard near Shaker Square.

Discography

Rude Boys
Albums
Rude Awakening - 1990
Rude House - 1992
Rude As Ever - 1997

Singles 
Come On Let's Do It - 1990
Written All Over Your Face - 1990 
Are You Lonely For Me - 1991
Heaven - 1991
My Kind Of Girl - 1993
Go Ahead And Cry - 1993
Nothing To One - 1997

Solo
Albums
Puttin' It Down - 1994

Singles
When I Think Of You - 2019
Beautiful - 2020
Holiday Song - 2021
All Of Me - 2021

References

External links

Little III All Music Credits
YouTube Joe Little All Of Me
Joe Little Writing & Producing Discogs Credits
Rude Boys Written All Over Your Face

Living people
1968 births
American male singer-songwriters